Cyborg Cop III is a 1995 American direct-to-video action science fiction film, starring Frank Zagarino and Bryan Genesse. Written by Jeff Albert & Dennis Dimster and directed by Yossi Wein, it was the third film in the Cyborg Cop film series. This film was preceded by Cyborg Cop (1993) and Cyborg Cop II (1994).

Plot
A scientist intends to turn students into mercenary cyborgs, but a police officer is determined to stop his experiments.

Cast
 Frank Zagarino as Saint Sebastian
 Bryan Genesse as Max Colley
 Jenny McShane as Eveylyn Reed
 Ian Roberts as Sheen
 Justin Illusion as Adam
 Ian Yule as Harvey Cartel
 Michael Brunner as Dr. Phelps
 Hal Orandini as Cooper
 Jurgen Hellberg as Derrick
 Tony Caprari as Seth
 Martin Le Maitre as Lennie
 Tyrone Stevenson as Oscar
 Arthur Berezin as Cyborg #1
 Wade Eastwood as Cyborg #2
 Vadim Dobrin as Cyborg #3

Reception

Critical response
Richard Scheib from Moria.co gave the film only one star and wrote: "Cyborg Cop III must be the single worst film that Nu World ever put out. It is hard to know where to begin". Mitch Lovell from The Video Vacuum gave Cyborg Cop III only one and a half stars: "Cyborg Cop 3 is pretty inept in just about every regard. But despite the fact that the cyborg is not a cop (he’s a Phys. Ed. student!!!), there is at least one police station massacre scene that blatantly rips off The Terminator".

References

External links
 
 

1995 films
1990s adventure films
1995 independent films
1990s science fiction action films
American adventure films
American independent films
American science fiction action films
American sequel films
Films directed by Yossi Wein
Cyborg films
Mad scientist films
Nu Image films
Cyborg Cop films
1990s English-language films
1990s American films